CEES may refer to:
 Centro de Estudios Económico-Sociales, Center for Economic and Social Studies, Guatemala
 Common European Economic Space, a sphere of cooperation between the European Union and Russia
 Centre d'essais d'engins spéciaux, the original name for the now abandoned French space center Centre interarmées d'essais d'engins spéciaux

See also
 Cees (given name)
 Kees (disambiguation)